Evangelos "Vangelis" Vourtzoumis (alternate spelling: Vaggelis) (born October 30, 1969) is a retired Greek professional basketball player.

Professional career
Vourtzoumis won three European titles on three different Greek teams. In 1993, he played with Aris and with them he won the FIBA Cup Winners' Cup against Efes, at Torino. In 1996, he played with Panathinaikos, and with them he was a winner of the EuroLeague championship at Paris. In 2001, he won the FIBA Saporta Cup championship with Maroussi.

Vourtzoumis also won the Greek League championship in 1989, 1990, and 1991, and two Greek Cups, in 1990 and 1992, while playing with Aris. He also won the 1998 Greek League championship, and the 1996 Greek Cup title, with Panathinaikos.

National team career
Vourtzoumis had eight caps with the senior men's Greek national basketball team, and he averaged 5.9 points per game.

External links
FIBA Europe Profile
Eurobasket.com Profile
Italian League Profile 

Living people
1969 births
Aris B.C. players
Greek Basket League players
Greek men's basketball players
K.A.O.D. B.C. players
Maroussi B.C. players
Near East B.C. players
Panathinaikos B.C. players
Shooting guards
Small forwards
S.S. Felice Scandone players
Basketball players from Athens